Goodyear Ballpark is a stadium in Goodyear, Arizona (a western suburb of Phoenix) and part of a $108 million baseball complex that is the current spring training home of the Cleveland Guardians and the Cincinnati Reds. The stadium opened to the public with a grand opening ceremony on February 21, 2009 and held its first Cactus League spring training baseball game on February 25, 2009. The stadium complex is owned by the city of Goodyear and contains the main field with a seating capacity of 10,311 along with several practice fields and team offices.

The main entrance of the stadium is modern and uses surfaces mimicking dark stained wood and polished metal. The entrance houses a team shop, several concession stands and is decorated with Guardians posters on the 1st base side and Reds on the 3rd base side. The entrance also has a third story terrace patio that can be rented for private parties. Outside the main entrance, the concourse features a 60-foot 6 inch fiberglass statue titled "The Ziz" created by artist Donald Lipski. The main entrance structure does not interfere with the inside the stadium which is a single tier of seating. Free standing polished metal awnings with fabric shades provide shelter from the sun down the third base line. Bullpens are located off the field in left and left center field. There is a large scoreboard in left field with general admission seating on a grass berm at its base. A cinder block concession stand in center field is painted dark green to provide a backdrop for the hitters. Right field features a second grass berm and a patio seating area and bar. The patio and bar area, like the Terrace patio, can be rented for private parties. There is a child play area with a Wiffle Ball field, inflatable batting and pitching games located on the first base side of the stadium.

Goodyear Ballpark replaces Chain of Lakes Park in Winter Haven, Florida, as the Guardians' spring training home, and Ed Smith Stadium in Sarasota, Florida, as the Reds' spring training home. The stadium is primarily used for baseball but also hosts community events such as the City of Goodyear's Star Spangled 4th, Fall Festival, and Home Plate for the Holidays.

References

External links
 Goodyear Ballpark Homepage

Cactus League venues
Cincinnati Reds spring training venues
Cleveland Indians spring training venues
Goodyear Tire and Rubber Company
Minor league baseball venues
Sports venues in Maricopa County, Arizona
2009 establishments in Arizona
Sports venues completed in 2009
Goodyear, Arizona
Baseball venues in Arizona
Arizona Complex League ballparks